For Life is an American legal drama television series created by Hank Steinberg that premiered on ABC on February 11, 2020. The series is inspired by the true story of Isaac Wright Jr., who was imprisoned for a crime that he did not commit. While incarcerated, Wright became an attorney and helped overturn the wrongful convictions of twenty of his fellow inmates, before finally proving his own innocence. In June 2020, the series was renewed for a second season which premiered on November 18, 2020. In May 2021, the series was canceled after two seasons.

Premise
The series focuses on Aaron Wallace, who has been sentenced to life in prison for a crime he did not commit. While incarcerated, Wallace becomes a lawyer and works as a defense attorney for others while striving to get his own sentence overturned. The series is loosely based on the life of Isaac Wright Jr.

Cast

Main

 Nicholas Pinnock as Aaron Wallace, a former club owner convicted of drug trafficking, although in truth, the drugs actually belonged to one of his friends. Now serving a life sentence with no possibility of parole, he earns a license to practice law and works to help his fellow inmates in court.
 Indira Varma as Safiya Masry, the warden who oversees the prison where Wallace is serving his sentence. She is reform-minded, and helps him as best she can, but their relationship is strained by her need to look out for her own family's interests.
 Joy Bryant as Marie Wallace, Aaron's wife, who has entered into a new relationship with Darius, one of his friends. Although she is sympathetic to her husband's plight, she also feels a need to move on and leave him in the past.
Mary Stuart Masterson as Anya Harrison (season 1), Safiya's wife, who is running for Attorney General of New York State.
 Dorian Crossmond Missick as Jamal Bishop, Aaron's closest friend in prison. He occasionally helps Aaron prepare cases.
 Tyla Harris as Jasmine Wallace, Aaron's teenage daughter. Unlike her mother, she has never stopped believing in her father and dreams of him returning home one day.
 Glenn Fleshler as Frank Foster (season 1), a senior corrections officer at the prison. Like most of his fellow guards, he dislikes Aaron.
 Boris McGiver as Glen Maskins (season 1; guest season 2), the prosecutor who led the team that put Aaron away, and who is now running for state Attorney General. He scorns his old foe's desire to clear his name, and will do whatever it takes, including blackmail, to keep him locked up for good.
 Timothy Busfield as Henry Roswell, a former New York state senator who assists Aaron in his quest to become a lawyer, and later helps him prepare to argue for his retrial in court.
John Doman as Alan Burke (recurring season 1; starring season 2), The attorney general of the state of New York.

Recurring
Brandon J. Dirden as Darius Johnson, Aaron's best friend who initially doubted him but later assists him during his retrial after finding new evidence suggesting Aaron is not guilty.
Erik Jensen as Dez O'Reilly, An assistant district attorney who works for Maskins.
50 Cent as Cassius Dawkins, A dangerous inmate that is transferred to Bellmore by Maskins. Once there, he immediately causes problems for Aaron, Frank, and Safiya.
Peter Greene as Wild Bill Miller, The leader of the white supremacy gang at Bellmore.
Felonious Munk as Hassan Nawaz, a prisoner at Bellmore in season one, released in season two.
Joseph Siravo as Jerry McCormack, The head of the prison board who oversees Bellmore and other correctional facilities. He signed the order that allowed Cassius Dawkins to be transferred to Bellmore.
Matt Dellapina as Tom Hansen, Safiya's assistant who helps her in monitoring all areas of the Bellmore Correctional facility. 
Toney Goins as Ronnie Baxter, Jasmine's boyfriend and the father of her child.
Sean Boyce Johnson as Scotty Williams, The probation officer assigned to Aaron when he is released.
Royce Johnson as Andy Josiah and Marcel's father. (season 2) 
Amina Robinson as Elaine Josiah, Andy's wife, and Marcel's mother. (season 2) 
Jace Bently as Marcel Josiah, Andy and Elaine's son. (season 2)

Episodes

Series overview

Season 1 (2020)

Season 2 (2020–21)

Production

Development 
On October 11, 2018, Deadline Hollywood reported that the then-unnamed series was under development at ABC. The pilot was written by Hank Steinberg, who was also set to executive produce alongside Alison Greenspan, Curtis "50 Cent" Jackson, Doug Robinson, Isaac Wright Jr., and George Tillman Jr. Production companies involved with the pilot included G-Unit Film & Television, Doug Robinson Productions, ABC Studios and Sony Pictures Television. On February 8, 2019, Deadline reported that the production had officially received a pilot order. In May 2019, ABC announced that they had ordered the pilot to series, now titled For Life, and that it would premiere as a mid-season replacement during the 2019–20 television season. On November 21, 2019, TVLine posted an exclusive series trailer and announced a premiere date of February 11, 2020. On June 15, 2020, ABC renewed the series for a second season which premiered on November 18, 2020. On May 14, 2021, ABC canceled the series after two seasons, but is expected to offer it to other networks. IMDb TV licensed the first two seasons and was touted as a possible home for a third season. In August 2021, IMDb TV opted to not pick up the series for a third season.

Casting 
In March 2019, it was announced that Nicholas Pinnock, Indira Varma, Joy Bryant, Mary Stuart Masterson, Boris McGiver, Tyla Harris, and Dorian Missick had joined the cast in the pilot's lead roles.

Filming 
On August 31, 2020, it was reported the second season had commenced production in New York City. However, on September 11, 2020, it was reported that the second season would suspend production for the day due to the COVID-19 test delays. Two days later, the suspension was extended by two weeks. Filming resumed at the end of the month.

Reception

Critical response
On the review aggregator website Rotten Tomatoes, the series holds an 86% approval rating based on 14 reviews, with an average rating of 7.12/10. The site's critics consensus reads: "Guided by Nicholas Pinnock's powerful performance, For Life eschews procedural pitfalls with a sturdy, empathetic script and an impressive ensemble to bring it to life." On Metacritic, the series has a weighted average score of 64 out of 100, based on 10 critics, indicating "generally favorable reviews".

Ratings

Season 1

Season 2

Notes

References

External links
 

2020 American television series debuts
2021 American television series endings
2020s American crime drama television series
2020s American legal television series
2020s prison television series
American legal drama television series
American prison television series
American thriller television series
American Broadcasting Company original programming
English-language television shows
Television series by ABC Studios
Television series by Sony Pictures Television
Television series based on actual events
Television productions suspended due to the COVID-19 pandemic
Television series by G-Unit Films and Television Inc.